The Prozacs are an American punk rock / pop punk band formed in 2001 by Jay Gauvin (aka J Prozac). The band has toured nationally and internationally and has appeared at events such as Insubordination Fest and Vans Warped Tour, Germany's Puke Fest and has released five studio albums and several splits and EP'S on various independent labels.

History
The band formed in September 2001 as a side project of Jay Gauvin of The GrandPrixx. Original line up of Gauvin on guitar and vocals, Kevin Bouvier on guitar, Matt Santos on drums and Dave Nocrasz on bass and vocals, lasted only three months. This line up wrote nine songs together and played three shows. By spring of 2002, Dave moved to guitar, Colin Vicalvi joined on bass and Justin Cohen on drums. This lasted until July, when The band recorded 16 demos in Ohio with Ralf Vermin on drums, then Marty Beach joining on drums in September 2002.

The band's first album, Thanks For Nothing, was recorded in the fall of 2002 and released on May 16, 2003. September 2003, Marty and Dave left the band, shortly after completing an East Coast tour with The Vents and several high-profile shows, including New England's Skate Fest. Glenn Robinson and Pete Camera of label mate band The Paranoids joined on drums and guitar. In April 2004 the “Monsters Night Out” CDEP was recorded, followed by Glenn and Pete's departure, and released in August 2004 on Cheapskate Records, following a North East USA tour with Darlington and Johnie 3 in the bands first incarnation as a three piece, with Mike Allan on drums. Mike left in September and Justin Cohen returned on drums for the remainder of 2004. The band released a split 7-Inch with Johnie 3 in early 2005 entitled “Turntable Not Included”, featuring Justin Cohen on drums. In January 2005, Matty Prozac joined on drums, Karl Ourand on guitar and sometimes bass, and that spring, a live album was recorded at CBGB in New York City.

Sean Watson replaced Colin on bass in mid 2005. The band released the "Odds N' Ends" 7-inch, "Summer Sounds" four-way split and a split CD with Johnie 3 entitled “We Should Split”. The band toured the East Coast and Midwest and played constantly through 2005 and 2006, including playing the Ernie Ball stage at Vans Warped Tour in Northampton, Massachusetts, the first Insubordination Fest in Baltimore in 2006  and tours with The Apers and Johnie 3. Insub Fest would be Karl's last show with the band d, being briefly replaced by Andrew Strikeout in the fall of 2006 on guitar before going on as a three piece again.

By March 2007 the "Pieces" 7-inch and the band's sophomore album Questions, Answers, And Things Never Found were released, followed by the release of “Stickin' With It”, a split with New Hampshire punk band The Guts. Sean left the band after 2007s summer Midwest/East Coast tours with Johnnie 3, including Insub Fest 2007 where Ben Weasel listed The Prozacs in the top 10 performers of that year on the Fat Wreck Chords website. Jed Dion briefly joined on guitar in the fall of 2007 and Colin Vicalvi returned on bass for a couple months before he was replaced by Bernie Lyons for the band's third album, Playing The Chords We Love, which was released on CD by Cheapskate Records in 2008 and LP by Knowhere and No Breaks Records in 2009. Matty Prozac and Bernie left the band prior to its completion and release in mid 2008.

Jimmy Craig and Adam Taylor joined on drums and bass in mid 2008 and the trio supported the release of Playing The Chords We Love and recorded a split 7-inch with the McRackins called Somebody Out There Loves Us. Adam briefly left the band, being replaced by Pete Martone on bass, before returning a few months later, with the addition of Rob Sarno on guitar. Sporadic weekend tours and shows were played in 2009 throughout 2011 with this line up,including Insub Fest 2010. This era occasionally saw Matty filling in on drums. The band did a week long tour in the fall of 2009 with Las Vegas band Murder Majesty, including shows in Las Vegas, Arizona and New Mexico, as a 3 piece, with Matty Prozac on drums and touring fill in bassist Bill Crumpton. During this era, the band released  a split CD with Italian punk band Super White Garlic, entitled “Broken Smiles”, a split 7-inch with No Intention called "Another Bright Idea" and the Cleaning Out The Closet collection album. Rob Sarno left the band in 2011, leaving the trio of J Prozac, Jimmy Craig and Adam Taylor.

In the summer of 2012, J Prozac was in the process of recording his debut solo album Here is My Heart, as well as writing new material, outside of The Prozacs, with ex-drummer Matty Prozac, initially called J Prozac and The Other Guys and only lasting five practices. Jon Kane was added on guitar with The Prozacs that summer. Adam Taylor left The Prozacs that fall, adding John Novak on bass. Jimmy left on drums by the end of 2012, with Matty joining back on drums officially for the first time since 2008. Going into 2013, the new line up of J Prozac, with Matty, Jon and John, lasted only five months and yielded a split 7-inch with Chicago band The Kobanes. J Prozac was also working at this time with Bil McRackin of Vancouver, Canada band McRackins, on what would become the album Doubtfire. Jimmy and Adam returned to The Prozacs in June 2013, with Adam leaving for good in November.

In January 2014, J Prozac and Jimmy started J Prozac & The Stilettos with Jeff/Scott Blood and Jays wife Andy Nihilate, which became Stiletto Bomb. The idea was moving on from The Prozacs, so Jimmy and J contributed songs that were headed for the next Prozacs album. The band performed live a mix of Prozacs, J Prozac and new Stiletto Bomb songs. The Prozacs collection CD Is This How It Ends? was released in 2014 to serve as a closure release of the band. During this time, J began playing again with Matty Prozac on drums as "J Prozac" and joined by Paul Basile on bass until August, then Nic Cross on bass thru December, with the idea of rebranding as The Sonic Diffusers which never stuck.

In 2015 the band did another split, this time with Darlington. In 2016, The Prozacs released a six-song EP titled "A Little Something" on Outloud & Pop-A-Pill Records. The band entered the studio in early 2016 to begin recording their 4th studio album Exist and in November the band celebrated its 15-year Anniversary with a local show. By January 2017, Matty and Nic had left the band and Jimmy Craig joined back on drums...with Nic joining back in August 2017 for the release of "Exist" on Outloud Records.

Throughout 2017, Jay and Jimmy wrote and worked on new material, entering the studio in January 2018 to record a tribute song of the Italian band The Manges. Also recorded was the material that became a split 7-inch with fellow Massachusetts band Marko & The Bruisers and the bands 5th studio album "Ambivalence", which was released in the summer of 2019 on Outloud Records. During 2017/2018 the band line up was mainly Jay and Jimmy, with Paul Basile and Nic Cross mainly serving as the live band, but not much involved in the writing of Ambivalence. Matty Prozac would occasionally fill in on drums or join the band on stage as an additional backing vocalist. Lincoln Zinzola of the Massachusetts youth punk band Color Killer would also make frequent appearances on stage with the band. The band performed many regional and East Coast shows in 2018, including with The Queers, Huntington's, The F.U.', Beatnik Termites and the Hartford, CT Vans Warped Tour.

Near the end of 2018, Paul and Nic both left the band with Matty Prozac officially joining back for the first time on bass. The trio of J Prozac, Jimmy Craig and Matty Prozac, the longest standing members in the bands history traveled to Germany, also featuring Andy Nihilate of Stiletto Bomb on vocals as well, in January of 2019 to play Puke Fest with Beatnik Termites, Zatopeks, Chromosomes, Sewer Rats and more. Two other shows were also played in Germany and Netherlands. A small run of shows followed that spring in Tennessee, Indiana and Ohio with St. Louis band The Radio Buzzkills.

Late spring 2019, Jed Dion of No Intention, who was briefly in the band in 2007, joined on guitar once again. J and Jimmy entered the studio in June with 7 new songs with no set destination and the band performed an album release show for Ambivalence which included guest appearances by J Prozacs children and Andy Nihilate of Stiletto Bomb for a 6-song Stiletto Bomb set performed with The Prozacs. October 2019, Matty Prozac was replaced on bass by Kyle Carnage of New Hampshire's The Labor Pains. The band continued to play shows as well as preparing a set of Screeching Weasel, The Mopes and Even In Blackouts songs for a show in Boston as the band to perform with John Jughead Pierson and other guests like B-Face of The Mopes, Bice of Even In Blackouts and Andy Nihilate. Unfortunately the worldwide pandemic that shut down the US in March 2020 prevented the show from happening.

Band members
Jay Prozac (current)
Jimmy Craig (current)
Adam Taylor
Matty Prozac
Jon Kane
John Novak
Rob Sarno
Dave Nocrasz
Kevin Bouvier
Matt Santos
Coliano Prozac
Justin Accident
Ralf Vermin (drums on demos 2002)
Marty Beach
Glenn Robinson
Pete Camera
Mike Allen
Karl Ourand
Sean Chin-nuts
Andrew Strikeout
Jed Intention (current)
Bernie Nobody
Paul Basile
Nic Cross
Pete Martone
Kyle Carnage
Greg Russian (current)

Discography

Studio albums
Thanks For Nothing CD (2003)
Questions, Answers, And Things Never Found CD (2007)
Playing The Chords We Love CD/LP(2008)
Exist CD (2017)
Ambivalence CD/LP (2019)

EPs
Monsters Night Out CDEP (2004)
Odds N' Ends 7-inch (2006)
Pieces 7-inch (2007)
A Little Something CDEP  (2016)

Live albums
Live At CBGB (2005) Cheapskate Records
Welcome To Camp Cheerful (2022) This Is Just A Record Label

Compilation albums
Cleaning Out The Closet (2010)
Is This How It Ends? (2014)
Fan Favs And Wannabe Hits! (2021)

Splits
Prozacs/Johnie 3 7-inch (2005)
Summer Sounds 4 Band Split CD (2005)
Prozacs/Johnie 3 CD (2006)
Prozacs/The Guts 7-inch (2007)
McRackins/Prozacs 7-inch (2009)
Prozacs/Super White Garlic CD (2010)
Prozacs/ No Intention 7-inch (2011)
Prozacs/Kobanes 7-inch (2013)
Prozacs/Darlington 7-inch (2015)
Prozacs/Marko and the Bruisers 7-inch (2018)

References

External links 
http://www.interpunk.com/band.cfm?BandID=4273&
http://www.myspace.com/theprozacs
http://www.reverbnation.com/theprozacs
http://www.theprozacs.com

Pop punk groups from Massachusetts
Punk rock groups from Massachusetts
Musical groups from Springfield, Massachusetts